The Marriage Ref is a comedy panel game that aired on ITV from 18 June to 30 July 2011 and is hosted by Dermot O'Leary.

Format
Three couples share their argument with the host and celebrity guests. After hearing both sides of the argument, each celebrity guest considers the strength and viability of the information presented, weighing in with their opinion. In the end, while the host may be swayed by the opinions of the celebrity guests, he is free to make his own to determine who is the victor in the debate.

Panellists

External links

2011 British television series debuts
2011 British television series endings
2010s British comedy television series
2010s British game shows
British panel games
English-language television shows
ITV panel games
Television game shows with incorrect disambiguation
Television series by Banijay
Television series by Zeppotron